Chika may refer to:

People
 Chika (Igbo given name)
 Chika (Japanese given name)
 Chika (general name)
 Chika (footballer) (born 1979), Brazilian defender
 Chika (rapper), Jane Chika Oranika, American rapper

Other uses
 Chika (software), a Japanese female vocal for Vocaloid 3
 Chika Entertainment Inc., a Chilean record label

See also

Chaka (disambiguation)
Chia (disambiguation)
Chiba (disambiguation)
Chica (disambiguation)
Chicka (disambiguation)
Chikan (disambiguation)
Chima (disambiguation)
China (disambiguation)
Chita (disambiguation)